The dividend yield or dividend–price ratio of a share is the dividend per share, divided by the price per share. It is also a company's total annual dividend payments divided by its market capitalization, assuming the number of shares is constant. It is often expressed as a percentage.

Dividend yield is used to calculate the earning on investment (shares) considering only the returns in the form of total dividends declared by the company during the year.

Its reciprocal is the price/dividend ratio.

Preferred share dividend yield

Nominal yield
Dividend payments on preferred stocks ("preference shares" in the UK) are set out in the prospectus. The name of the preferred share will typically include its 
nominal yield relative to the issue price: for example, a 6% preferred share. However, the dividend may under some circumstances be passed or reduced.

Current yield
The current yield is the ratio of the annual dividend to the current market price, which will vary over time.

Yield to call
Some preferred stock issues are callable at a future date, a feature that provides the issuer an option to buy back the shares, starting at a given future call date, at a given call price.  These factors are stated in the issuing prospectus.  The yield to call figure for such a stock is the effective current yield calculated on the assumption that the issuer will exercise the call contingency immediately on the call date, returning the call price to the share owner.  The yield to call is implicitly a current measure of a future value, accounting for the difference between the call price that will apply in the future versus the current market price.  Since the current market price may be above or below the call price, the yield to call may be below or above the current yield, respectively.

Yield to worst
For callable preferred stocks, the yield to worst is the lesser of the current yield and the yield to call.  Yield to worst represents the minimum of the various yield measures, across the returns resulting from various contingent future events.  This amounts to the worst case outcome from the investor's position.

Preferred issues that are not callable, or whose call date has already arrived, do not have a yield to call or yield to worst. The only present yield measure in such cases is the current yield.

Common share dividend yield
Unlike preferred stock, there is no stipulated dividend for common stock ("ordinary shares" in the UK). Instead, dividends paid to holders of common stock are set by management, usually with regard to the company's earnings. There is no guarantee that future dividends will match past dividends or even be paid at all. The historic yield is calculated using the following formula:

Its dividend yield would be calculated as follows:

The yield for the S&P 500 is reported this way. US newspaper and web listings of common stocks apply a somewhat different calculation: They report the latest quarterly dividend multiplied by 4, divided by the current price. Others try to estimate the next year's dividend and use it to derive a prospective dividend yield. Such a scheme is used for the calculation of the FTSE UK Dividend+ Index. Estimates of future dividend yields are by definition uncertain.

Trailing dividend yield
Trailing dividend yield gives the dividend percentage paid over a prior period, typically one year. A trailing twelve month dividend yield, denoted as "TTM", includes all dividends paid during the past year in order to calculate the dividend yield. While a trailing dividend can be indicative of future dividends, it can be misleading as it does not account for dividend increases or cuts, nor does it account for a special dividend that may not occur again in the future.

Forward dividend yield
Forward dividend yield is some estimation of the future yield of a stock. This may be an analyst estimate, or just using the company's guidance. For example, if a company has announced a dividend increase, even though nothing has been paid, this may be assumed to be the payment for the next year. Similarly, if a company has said that it will suspend its dividend, the yield would be assumed to be zero.

The calculation is done by taking the first dividend payment and annualizing it and then divide that number by the current stock price.

The trailing dividend yield is done in reverse by taking the last dividend annualized divided by the current stock price.

Related measures
The reciprocal of the dividend yield is the price/dividend ratio.
The dividend yield is related to the earnings yield via:
 earnings yield = dividend yield · dividend cover, and
 dividend yield = earnings yield · dividend payout ratio.

Desirability
Historically, a higher dividend yield has been considered to be desirable among many investors. A high dividend yield can be considered to be evidence that a stock is underpriced or that the company has fallen on hard times and future dividends will not be as high as previous ones.  Similarly a low dividend yield can be considered evidence that the stock is overpriced or that future dividends might be higher. Some investors may find a higher dividend yield attractive, for instance as an aid to marketing a fund to retail investors, or maybe because they cannot get their hands on the capital, which may be tied up in a trust arrangement. In contrast some investors may find a higher dividend yield unattractive, perhaps because it increases their tax bill.

Dividend yield fell out of favor somewhat during the 1990s because of an increasing emphasis on price appreciation over dividends as the main form of return on investments.

The importance of the dividend yield in determining investment strength is still a debated topic; most recently, Foye and Valentincic (2017) suggest that high dividend yield stocks tend to outperform. The persistent historic low in the Dow Jones dividend yield during the early 21st century is considered by some investors as indicative that the market is still overvalued.

Dow Industrials
The dividend yield of the Dow Jones Industrial Average, which is obtained from the annual dividends of all 30 companies in the average divided by their cumulative stock price, has also been considered to be an important indicator of the strength of the U.S. stock market. Historically, the Dow Jones dividend yield has fluctuated between 3.2% (during market highs, for example in 1929) and around 8.0% (during typical market lows). The highest ever Dow Jones dividend yield occurred in 1932 when it yielded over 15%, which was years after the famous stock market collapse of 1929, when it yielded only 3.1%.

With the decreased emphasis on dividends since the mid-1990s, the Dow Jones dividend yield has fallen well below its historical low-water mark of 3.2% and reached as low as 1.4% during the stock market peak of 2000.

The Dogs of the Dow is a popular investment strategy which invests in the ten highest dividend yield Dow stocks at the beginning of each calendar year.

S&P 500
In 1982 the dividend yield on the S&P 500 Index reached 6.7%. Over the following 16 years, the dividend yield declined to just a percentage value of 1.4% during 1998, because stock prices increased faster than dividend payments from earnings, and public company earnings increased slower than stock prices. During the 20th century, the highest growth rates for earnings and dividends over any 30-year period were 6.3% annually for dividends, and 7.8% for earnings.

Yield on cost
Yield is sometimes computed based on the amount paid for a stock. The yield with the current price is 4% ( over $50 share price -> 2/50 = 0.04).

See also
Cost of capital
Dividend payout ratio
Earnings yield
Liquidating dividend
P/E ratio

Lists
List of finance topics

References

External links
Understanding dividend yields by Investopedia.
Dividend Yields by Yahoo Education Center.
Dividend Yield Calculator

Further reading
 Cohen, R.D. (2002, November) "The Relationship Between the Equity Risk Premium, Duration and Dividend Yield" Wilmott Magazine, pp 84–97.

Yield
Financial ratios